is a 3xCD-R DJ mix by Alec Empire dedicated to Robert Moog. The set was sold only during Alec Empire's 2005-2006 Futurist tour. The set comes in a  plastic envelope which fastens with velcro, spraypainted metallic blue. The discs themselves are 5", but the actual recording surface is only 3".

According to Alec Empire:
"I mean it's a bit more than a DJ mix because there are fx, extra sounds and shit involved."

Track listing
CD 1
(untitled) - 18:48
CD 2
(untitled) - 18:15

References
discogs.com entry

Alec Empire albums
2005 remix albums